Xavier Boniface Saintine (10 July 1798 – 21 January 1865) was a French dramatist and novelist.

Biography 
He was born Joseph Xavier Boniface in Paris in 1798. In 1823, he produced a volume of poetry in the manner of the Romanticists, entitled Poèmes, odes, épîtres. In 1836 appeared Picciola, a novel about the Count de Charney, a political prisoner in Piedmont, whose reason was saved by his cultivation of a tiny flower growing between the paving stones of his prison yard. This story is a masterpiece of the sentimental kind, and has been translated into many European languages. The novel earned him renown and came to be regarded as a classic of French literature.

He produced many other novels, none of striking individuality with the exception of Seul (1857), which purported to be the authentic record of Alexander Selkirk on his desert island. Saintine was a prolific dramatist, and collaborated in more than 200 pieces with Eugène Scribe and others, usually under the name of Xavier.  He co-wrote the story which was to form the basis for Bellini's opera I puritani. He died in Paris in 1865.

Selected works 
A very prolific author, he wrote more than 200 theatre plays and novels under the pen names Saintine, X.B. Saintine, Joseph Xavier Saintine, Xavier.

 Books
 Poëmes, odes, épitres. (1823) 
 Jonathan le Visionnaire, contes philosophiques et moraux. (1825)
 Histoire des Guerres d'Italie, Campagne des Alpes. (1826)
 Histoire de la Civilisation antédiluvienne. (1830)
 Le Mutilé.  (1832)
 Une Maîtresse de Louis XIII. in 2 volumes  &  (1834)
 Picciola. (1836)
 Les Soirées de Jonathan, in 2 volumes  &  (1837)
 Antoine, l'ami de Robespierre. (1839)
 Les Récits dans la Tourelle : Un Rossignol pris au Trébuchet, etc. . (1844)
 Les Métamorphoses de la Femme.  (1846)
 Les trois Reines. (1853)
 Seul ! (1857)
 Chrisna.  (1860)
 Trois ans en Judée.  (1860)
 La belle Cordière et ses trois amoureux. (1861)
 Le Chemin des écoliers (1861) including an illustrated edition with 450 vignettes by Gustave Doré, grand in-8, broché. 
 Contes de toutes les couleurs : Léonard le cocher, etc.  (1862)
 La Mythologie du Rhin  ;(1862) including an edition illustrated by Gustave Doré, grand in-8, broché.
 La Mère Gigogne et ses trois filles : La nature et ses trois règnes ; causeries et contes d'un bon papa sur l'histoire naturelle et les objets les plus usuels (1863), grand in-8, illustrated with 171 vignettes by Foulquier and Faguet, broché. 
 La Seconde Vie. (1864)

 Theater plays
 1833 (25 September): Têtes Rondes et Cavaliers, with Jacques-François Ancelot, Théâtre du Vaudeville; it also formed the basis for the libretto of the 1835 opera I Puritani, by Vincenzo Bellini
 1834: Le Mari de la favorite, five-act comedy, with Michel Masson, Théâtre de la Porte-Saint-Martin
 1836: Madame Favart, with Michel Masson, Théâtre du Palais Royal
 1841: Mademoiselle Sallé with Jean-François Bayard and Dumanoir, Théâtre du Palais Royal

References 

Attribution

Further reading 
 Clapin, A. C. (1883). "Preface", Picciola. Oxford University Press. Detailed biography of Saintine in the introduction to his most famous work.

External links 
 
 

1798 births
1865 deaths
Writers from Paris
19th-century French dramatists and playwrights
19th-century French novelists